José Fernandes de Paula better known as Peterpan (Maceió, Brazil 21 January 1911 — Rio de Janeiro, Brazil 28 April 1983) was a Brazilian instrumentalist and composer. His 50-year career began in the 1930s and spanned into the 1980s.

References 

Brazilian composers
Male composers
1911 births
1983 deaths
20th-century male musicians